Teddy O'Connor (born 1946 in Rathnure, County Wexford) is an Irish retired hurler. He played for his local club Rathnure and was a member of the Wexford senior inter-county team from 1967 until1978.

References

1946 births
Living people
Rathnure hurlers
Wexford inter-county hurlers
Leinster inter-provincial hurlers